Anderson Daniel McFarlan (November 1, 1873 – September 23, 1924) was a Major League Baseball pitcher. He played in 1895 for the Louisville Colonels, and 1899 for two different teams, the Brooklyn Superbas and Washington Senators.

McFarlan was the first player born in Texas to play in Major League Baseball.

References

External links

Major League Baseball pitchers
Louisville Colonels players
Washington Senators (1891–1899) players
Brooklyn Superbas players
Hampden–Sydney Tigers baseball players
San Antonio Missionaries players
Charleston Seagulls players
Kansas City Cowboys (minor league) players
Minneapolis Minnies players
Evansville Black Birds players
Rochester Blackbirds players
Rochester Brownies players
Montreal Royals players
Rochester Bronchos players
Providence Grays (minor league) players
Portland Browns players
Boise Fruit Pickers players
Washington and Lee Generals baseball players
Baseball players from Texas
19th-century baseball players
1873 births
1924 deaths